The Tennent's Women's Premiership 2021–2022 kicked off on 12 September 2021.

Teams
Ayr RFC step down from the Premiership to National League Division 1, they were replaced  by the Heriot’s Blues Women who were runner-up in the Premiership Play Off in 2019.

Regular season

Standings

Results

Week 1

Week 2

Week 3

Week 4

Week 5

Week 6

Week 7

Week 8

Week 9

Week 10

Week 11

Week 12

League match cancelled, points shared and a friendly match arranged as requested by the clubs. Re-scheduled from 28.11.21 (Snow)

League match cancelled and points shared with the clubs played a friendly at Bridgehaugh. Re-scheduled from 28.11.21 (Frozen Pitch)

League match cancelled, points shared and a friendly match arranged as requested by the clubs. Re-scheduled from 28.11.21 (pitch unfit)

References

2021 in women's rugby union
2022 in women's rugby union
Women's Premiership